Sauvagesia is a genus of plants in the family Ochnaceae.

Species include:

 Sauvagesia brevipetala Gilli
 Sauvagesia erecta
 Sauvagesia linearifolia
 Sauvagesia oliveirae
 Sauvagesia ribeiroi

References 

Ochnaceae
Malpighiales genera
Taxonomy articles created by Polbot